Cixidia is a genus of true bugs belonging to the family Achilidae.

The genus was first described by Fieber in 1866.

The species of this genus are found in Europe and Northern America.

Species
These species belong to the genus Cixidia:

 Cixidia advena (Spinola, 1839)
 Cixidia brittoni (Metcalf, 1923)
 Cixidia colorata (Van Duzee, 1908)
 Cixidia confinis (Zetterstedt, 1828) (Kiefernrindenzikade)
 Cixidia confusa (Beirne, 1950)
 Cixidia floridae
 Cixidia fusca (Walker, 1951)
 Cixidia fusiformis (Van Duzee, 1910)
 Cixidia genei (Spinola, 1839)
 Cixidia henshawi (Van Duzee, 1910)
 Cixidia kabakovi Emeljanov, 2005
 Cixidia kasparyani Anufriev, 1983
 Cixidia lapponica (Zetterstedt, 1840)
 Cixidia leptarcya (Amyot, 1847)
 Cixidia maghrebina Asche, 2015
 Cixidia manitobiana (Beirne, 1950)
 Cixidia marginicollis (Spinola, 1839)
 Cixidia maroccana Anufriev, 1969
 Cixidia mersinica (Dlabola, 1987)
 Cixidia misbeca (Amyot, 1847)
 Cixidia ochrophara (Amyot, 1847)
 Cixidia okunii (Matsumura, 1914)
 Cixidia opaca (Say, 1830)
 Cixidia pallida (Say, 1830)
 Cixidia parnassia (StÃ¥l, 1859)
 Cixidia pilatoi D'Urso & Guglielmino, 1995 (Echte Rindenzikade)
 Cixidia polias Emeljanov, 2005
 Cixidia sabecus (Amyot, 1847)
 Cixidia septentrionalis (Provancher, 1889)
 Cixidia shikokuana (Ishihara, 1954)
 Cixidia shoshone (Ball, 1933)
 Cixidia sikaniae D'Urso & Guglielmino, 1995
 Cixidia slossonae
 Cixidia slossoni (Van Duzee, 1908)
 Cixidia tristirops (Amyot, 1847)
 Cixidia ussuriensis (Kusnezov, 1928)
 Cixidia variegata (Van Duzee, 1908)
 Cixidia woodworthi (Van Duzee, 1916)

References

Achilidae